Higher Giant is an American, New York City-based punk rock supergroup. The band was formed in 2007 by Ernie Parada, Jason Lehrhoff, and Alex Volonino, who were in The Arsons together, and Dave Wagenschutz.

Higher Giant released two EPs in 2009. The First Five was released in March 2009 by Runner Up Records and Creep Records. Then, Al's Moustache was released in August 2009 by Black Numbers Records.

Members
 Ernie Parada (In Your Face, Token Entry, Black Train Jack, John Henry, Grey Area, The Arsons) – vocals, guitar
 Jason Lehrhoff (Warzone, Greyarea, The Arsons) – guitar
 Alex Volonino (The Arsons) – bass
 Dave Wagenschutz (Lifetime, Kid Dynamite, Good Riddance, Paint It Black) – drums

Discography
 The First Five (2009, Runner Up Records/Creep Records)
 Al's Moustache (2009, Black Numbers)

References

Punk rock groups from New York (state)
Musical groups from New York City